Julio Horacio Guardia (born 14 December 1962) is an Argentine navy officer. He serves as Chief of the General Staff of the Argentine Navy .

He graduated from the Naval Academy in 1985.

References 

Living people
1962 births
Place of birth missing (living people)
Argentine Navy admirals